Mawlaik may refer to several places in Burma:

Mawlaik, town and seat of Mawlaik District, Sagaing Region
Mawlaik, Kale, village in Kale Township, Sagaing Region